The Whanki Museum is a private art museum in Jongno-gu, in central Seoul, South Korea. It was established  by the Whanki Foundation mainly to exhibit and commemorate the art of Whanki Kim, one of Korea's foremost abstract painters. The museum is located in Buam-dong, close to Seongbuk-dong, Seongbuk-gu, where Whanki Kim and his wife spent many years. The atmosphere and natural environment of the two places have much in common. The museum building was designed by architect Kyu-seung Woo. Construction began in 1990, and the museum opened in November, 1992.

The bulk of the collection is displayed in the main building which was specially designed to showcase Whanki Kim's art. Special exhibitions are held in Annex 1, which includes a café and art shop on the ground floor. The latest addition, Annex 2, is used for lectures.

See also
List of museums in Seoul
List of museums in South Korea
Korean painting

References

External links
 
 A visit to the Whanki Museum (환기 미술관)
 

Art museums and galleries in Seoul
Art museums established in 1992
1992 establishments in South Korea
Biographical museums in South Korea
20th-century architecture in South Korea